Lake Superior Provincial Park is one of the largest provincial parks in Ontario, covering about  along the northeastern shores of Lake Superior between Sault Ste. Marie and Wawa in Algoma District in Northeastern Ontario, Canada. Ontario Highway 17 (at this point part of the Trans-Canada Highway) now runs through the park. When the park was established by Ontario in 1944, there was no road access.

History
Traces of ancient volcanic activity can be seen in rock outcrops near Red Rock Lake and several other sites.  For more than 2000 years, this was long an area of occupation by various cultures of indigenous peoples. The oldest artifacts found here date to approximately 500 BC.

At Agawa Rock, near the mouth of the Agawa River, there are pictographs created by the early Ojibwe people of this region. The figures are painted on the rock with a mixture of powdered hematite and animal fats and are estimated to be 150–400 years old.  The records are visual representations of both historical events and legendary figures.

Selwyn Dewdney was the first scholarly figure to discover the pictographs. The first written description of these pictographs was published in 1851 by American ethnologist, Henry Rowe Schoolcraft. As United States Indian agent in Sault Ste. Marie, he conducted extensive studies about the Ojibwe people, aided by his wife Jane Johnston Schoolcraft, who was half-Ojibwe and the daughter of a major fur trader in the city.

While the Ojibwe were forced to cede their lands to the Canadian government under an 1850 Treaty in exchange for reserves and annuities, they have preserved hunting and fishing rights to former territory. In the 1940s, the Lake Superior Provincial Park was established, and it took over an Ojibwe fishing village known as Nanabozhung within the boundaries.

From the late 20th century, the Batchewana First Nation of Ojibways, whose traditional territory included the village, also known as Gargantua Harbour, had long agitated to regain road access to the village. One of its reserves is Rankin Location Indian Reserve No. 15D in Ontario and members have fished at Gargantua Harbour. In 2007 some 200 members, led by Chief Dean Sayers, restored a road to the village along a park trail, without a work permit. After trying to negotiate with the band, the Ministry of Natural Resources (MNR) filed charges against it in 2008, saying that the First Nation had damaged park property.

The First Nation contended this was a traditional fishing and ceremonial area and construction of the road was necessary to exercise their Treaty rights. In March 2015 Justice Logan dismissed all but one of the eleven counts in the case. In his decision, Logan upheld that a Treaty right existed for the Batchewana First Nation to use Gargantua Harbour for commercial fishing and agreed that the road was necessary to get to the shore. He upheld one charge against Sayers and the Band for obstruction, requiring a fine to be paid.

Activities

Recreational activities in the park include canoeing (especially in the interior lakes of the park), camping and hiking, fishing, swimming, boating, hunting, educational programs, wildlife viewing, cross-country skiing and snowshoeing.

Hiking Trails
The 11 hiking trails located throughout the park can be accessed from Agawa Bay, Crescent Lake, or Rabbit Blanket Lake campgrounds, or from Highway 17. The Coastal Trail stretches  and reveals the beautiful Lake Superior coastline. It is very demanding and can take between 5 and 7 days to complete. The Coastal Trail is part of the long-distance Voyageur Hiking Trail.

The 11 trails offer a wide variety of distances and difficulty from short half-hour hikes to multi-day trips.  Orphan Lake Trail is a moderate difficulty trail that has a variety of terrain over an 8 km loop and takes approximately 2–4 hours to complete.

Pictographs
A short trail leads to the Agawa Rock Pictographs. They are located on a sheer rock face on Lake Superior. Several of the pictographs can be seen only from the water.

Facilities

Park office
The park office is located in the northern part of the park at Red Rock Lake. Senior staff, including the superintendent, can be reached at the park office between 9 am and 4 pm during summer months.

Campgrounds

Agawa Bay
Agawa Bay has 152 campsites. There are two comfort stations located in the campground equipped with showers, laundry facilities and flush toilets. An amphitheatre is located in the campground, and presentations here by park staff are a common occurrence in the summer months.  All the campsites are within walking distance to Lake Superior. There is a premium for campsites located beside the beach. Permits are obtained at the Agawa Bay gatehouse. Firewood and ice is available for purchase at the Agawa Bay gatehouse.

Agawa Bay is also the location of the park's visitor centre where information can be obtained about the park and surrounding areas. There are washrooms and a gift shop open to the public from May through September.  The visitor centre has a display area orchestrating the history of the park and the influence that Lake Superior Park had on the fur trade, the Group of Seven artists and shipwrecks in the region. There are trailer storage opportunities available, but arrangements must be made with senior staff located in the northern part of the park at the park office. The visitor centre has received a number of awards for its design.

Crescent Lake
Crescent Lake (now closed) had 46 campsites and was located approximately 2 kilometres off of Highway 17 beside Crescent Lake.

Rabbit Blanket Lake
Rabbit Blanket Lake has 60 campsites. There is one comfort station located within the campground equipped with showers, laundry facilities and flush toilets. The campground is located beside Rabbit Blanket Lake. Firewood and ice can be purchased at the Rabbit Blanket gatehouse or the park office.

Ecology

Forests
Due to its size and location, the park lies in both the Eastern forest-boreal transition ecoregion and the Central Canadian Shield forests region.  Its rugged landscape is wooded with a mix of coniferous and deciduous trees such as pine, maples and birch. Sugar maple dominates many forests in the southern two-thirds of the park.

Topography 
The predominantly rocky coastline is interrupted by sandy beaches in a few locations.  The park is situated within the Great Canadian Shield, dominated by exposed rocks or a thin layer of soil over rock.

Fauna
The park supports a large moose (Alces alces) population. The best time for viewing moose is in the months of April, May, and June when the spring melt occurs. Other large animals found in the park include:
 White-tailed deer (Odocoileus virginianus)
 Black bear (Ursus americanus)
 Grey wolf (Canis lupus)
During the summer months, the park provides habitat for warblers and other birds of the northern forests.

Lakes and rivers
In addition to its namesake, the park has numerous smaller lakes in its interior. A number of rivers also flow from the park's interior:
 Agawa River
 Baldhead River
 Coldwater River
 Gargantua River
 Old Woman River
 Red Rock River
 Sand River
 Speckled Trout Creek
Several waterfalls on these rivers can be seen from the road or reached via hiking trails.

References

External links 

Friends of Lake Superior Park
"Gargantua Harbour Decision" under Justice of the Peace Thomas Logan, 24 March 2015, ScribD

Provincial parks of Ontario
Parks in Algoma District
Protected areas established in 1944
1944 establishments in Ontario